NBR2 is a gene best known for its location near the breast cancer associated gene BRCA1. Like BRCA1, NBR2 has been a subject of research, but links to breast cancer are currently inconclusive.

NBR2 recently was identified as a glucose starvation-induced long non-coding RNA. NBR2 interacts with AMP-activated protein kinase (AMPK), a critical energy sensor in most eukaryotic cells, and promotes AMPK function to mediate energy stress response. Knockdown of NBR2 attenuates energy stress-induced AMPK activation, resulting in unchecked cell cycling, altered apoptosis/autophagy response, and increased tumour development in vivo. It is now appreciated that NBR2, a former junk gene, plays critical roles in tumor suppression.

References

External links